Janjevo or Janjevë (in Albanian) is a village or small town in the Lipljan municipality in eastern Kosovo.

The settlement has a long history, having been mentioned for the first time in 1303 as a Catholic parish. The town was prior to the Kosovo War (1998–99) inhabited by a majority of Croats, known by their demonym as Janjevci, who since have left massively for Croatia.

Geography
Janjevo is described as a village or small town, located in Lipjan municipality, by Gornja Gušterica and Teče.

History

Middle Ages

Janjevo was first mentioned in 1303. Although only a Catholic parish is mentioned, and no information on mining activity, it is assumed that the Catholic community in fact drew from miners, gathered in such numbers to constitute a parish. Whether these Catholics were Ragusans or Saxons is unknown; with the opening of mines in medieval Serbia, Saxons (Sasi) are mentioned as mining specialists; although they are not mentioned as inhabiting Janjevo, they most likely did, as the settlement Šaškovac located less than 1 km from Janjevo points to. In 1346, the Pope sent a letter to Stefan Dušan regarding churches that belonged to the Diocese of Kotor, in which Janjevo is mentioned.

In the first half of the 15th century, when the area was still part of a Serbian state, a Ragusan colony appeared in Janjevo. At this time, Janjevo, along with Novo Brdo and Trepča, were the most important mines in Serbia. Out of 15 manholes only two produced qualitative ore. From 1455 a coin mint was active in Janjevo. The local Catholic church, dedicated to St. Nicholas, was built in the 15th century. In a tablet dating to 1425, Stephanus Marci, a priest of the Janjevo parish, is mentioned. In 1441, priest Andreas was the head of the Janjevo parish, based in that church. The population of this Catholic parish of Janjevo were mainly members of a Ragusan colony (to which Andreas also belonged). Janjevo most likely fell to the Ottoman Empire after the Ottoman conquest of Novo Brdo (1455).

Ottoman period
In 1530–31 there were six Christian and one Muslim neighbourhoods (mahala) in Janjevo. In 1569–70 it became an imperial estate with revenue (hass). There were at that time seven neighbourhoods. Marino Bizzi (1570–1624), the Archbishop of Bar, listed 120 Latin (Catholic), 200 schismatic (Orthodox), and 180 Turkish (Muslim) homes, during his journey in Ottoman Serbia in 1610.

According to local tradition, the population moved to its present location from "Old Janjevo" (located between the hills of Borelina and Surnjevica) in  1630 due to Albanian zulum (injustice).

One of the first schools in the history of Kosovo opened in Janjevo in 1665 and is still in use today.

Contemporary
In 1922, Henry Baerlein noted that the Austrians had for thirty years tried to albanianize the Janjevo population. In 1997, the Croatian government began resettling Croats from the village to Kistanje in Croatia. During the Kosovo War (1998–99), many of the Croats resettled to Croatia as they feared the ongoing battle waged by the Yugoslav army and the Kosovo Liberation Army. As of 2011, only 270 out of the pre-war 1500 Croats remain in the village.

Population
The population of Janjevci has decreased since the 1970s. Since 1971, the Janjevci have immigrated from Janjevo to Zagreb and Kistanje, causing a decline in the population of the Janjevci. There is a Catholic church (St. Nikola) located in the town about 100 meters from the main mosque.

Anthropology
In the Middle Ages, Ragusans and likely Saxons (Sasi) inhabited the village. The inhabitants of Janjevo have in the past called themselves and been called "Latins". Anthropologist A. Urošević noted during field study, published in 1935, that many Janjevans lacked national consciousness. They spoke a Kosovan dialect, as the Serbs, but called it Janjevan. As the Serbs, they had family feast days (slava).

In 1991, the most numerous families were the Palić (Matić and Rucić), Glasnović (Tomkić and Topalović), Ćibarić, Berišić (Ancić, Mazarekić and Golomejić), Macukić, and Cirimotić.

Demographics
According to the 2011 census, there was a total number of 2137 inhabitants. Albanians numbered 1586, Croats - 270, Roma - 177, Turks - 118, Ashkali - 11, Bosniaks - 5, Unknown - 4, Serbs - 1, Undeclared - 1.

Demographic history
1991: 4797; Croats - 2859, Roma - 344, Albanians - 59 ( 1539), Serbs - 8
1981: 5086; Croats - 3534, Albanians - 1078, Roma - 331, Serbs - 21.
1971: 4742; Croats - 3761, Albanians - 576, Roma - 218, Serbs - 51.
1961: 3762; Croats - 3052, Albanians - 302, Serbs - 47, Roma - 7.
1953: 3420
1948: 3090

Notable people
 Shtjefën Gjeçovi (1874–1929), Albanian Catholic priest, nationalist, ethnologist and folklorist. His monument resides in the town, and his house is now a museum.
 Matija Mazarek (1726–fl. 1792), Catholic archbishop
 Pajsije, Serbian Patriarch 1614–1647
 Vikentije Popović-Hadžilavić, Metropolitan of Karlovci 1713–1725

Notes

References

Sources

External links

Janjevo Project in Oral History of Kosovo

Villages in Lipljan